Jaworowski is a surname of Polish origin. Notable people with the surname include:

Jan Jaworowski (1928 - 2013), Polish and American mathematician
Leo Jaworowski (1764 - 1833), Belarusian bishop
Zbigniew Jaworowski (1927 - 2011), Polish physician

Polish-language surnames